Sykesville may refer to a location in the United States:

 Sykesville, Maryland, in Carroll County
 Sykesville, New Jersey, in Burlington County
 Sykesville, Pennsylvania, in Jefferson County